NBC Springfield could refer to:
 WWLP (Springfield, Massachusetts)
 WAND (TV) (Springfield, Illinois)
 KYTV (TV station) (Springfield, Missouri)